Susan Kay Mosier, M.D. (born July 10, 1959) is the former Secretary of the Kansas Department of Health and Environment. On November 13, 2014, Kansas Governor Sam Brownback named Dr. Mosier as the Interim Secretary, replacing Dr. Robert Moser, who stepped down at the end of November. Mosier was a Republican member of the Kansas House of Representatives, representing the 67th district.  Her term began in 2011 and she resigned her seat, effective February 1, 2012, to accept the position director of Medicaid in the Kansas Department of Health and Environment.

Mosier is an ophthalmologist and former owner of Mosier Eye Care in Manhattan, Kansas; she closed her practice when appointed Medicaid director for Kansas.  She is board certified and has specialties in two areas:  eye surgery and refractive surgical procedures.

Record
Mosier sponsored four bills and eleven resolutions in the 2011 session.  She sponsored two resolutions in the 2012 session before resigning.

Same-Sex Marriage

Once Mosier assumed the office of Secretary of KDHE, her name was substituted for Dr. Moser's in the Marie v. Moser case.

Committee membership
Mosier served on four legislative committees in 2011:
Insurance
Joint Committee on Heath Policy Oversight
Health and Human Services
Financial Institutions

In 2011, she was assigned to the Special Committee on Financial Institutions and Insurance.

Campaign donors
Mosier's 2010 campaign was 73% donor-funded and 27% self-funded.

References

External links
Kansas Legislature - Susan Mosier
Project Vote Smart profile
Campaign contributions:
Kansas Department of Health and Environment

Republican Party members of the Kansas House of Representatives
Living people
Women state legislators in Kansas
Politicians from Manhattan, Kansas
Kansas State University alumni
McCombs School of Business alumni
University of Kansas alumni
University of Iowa alumni
American ophthalmologists
1959 births
Women ophthalmologists
21st-century American women politicians
21st-century American politicians